Mahani (also Romanized as Māhānī, Māhanī, Māhonī, and Mahuni; also known as Maha’i) is a village in Arabkhaneh Rural District, Shusef District, Nehbandan County, South Khorasan Province, Iran. At the 2006 census, its population was 317, in 75 families.

References 

Populated places in Nehbandan County